Two Parts Together is the third studio album by American post-hardcore band Big Ups. It was released on May 18, 2018 under Exploding in Sound.

In support for the album, the band went on a US and Europe tour in May−July 2018.

Critical reception
Two Parts Together was met with universal acclaim reviews from critics. At Metacritic, which assigns a weighted average rating out of 100 to reviews from mainstream publications, this release received an average score of 85, based on 4 reviews.

Track listing

References

2018 albums
Exploding in Sound albums